Capitol Peak is a peak in the Black Hills in the U.S. state of Washington.  It is the highest peak in the Black Hills. Capitol Peak is located in the Capitol State Forest.  There is a partially paved road to the summit called the Sherman Valley Road.  The summit hosts a communications facility that includes an array of cell phone and radio towers.  On a clear day, looking to the west is a view of Elma and the Satsop Nuclear Power Plant.  Looking to the east is a view of Mount Rainier, Mount St. Helens, Mount Adams, the Puget Sound, and the Olympia area.

References

External links
 

Mountains of Thurston County, Washington
Mountains of Washington (state)